Liscomb Mills is a small rural community along the Eastern Shore Canadian province of Nova Scotia, located in the Municipality of the District of Guysborough, in Guysborough County. The community lies along the Marine Drive on Trunk 7. The community is home to the Liscombe Lodge Resort and Conference Centre.

References

External links
 Liscombe Lodge Website

Communities in Guysborough County, Nova Scotia
General Service Areas in Nova Scotia